Georgina Carreras Caner (born 9 June 1989), commonly known as Gio, is a Spanish football midfielder. She previously played for UE L'Estartit, Atlético Madrid and CE Sant Gabriel.

She was an Under-19 international.

References

External links
Profile at Txapeldunak.com 

1989 births
Living people
Spanish women's footballers
Women's association football midfielders
UE L'Estartit players
Atlético Madrid Femenino players
Valencia CF Femenino players
PSV (women) players
CE Sant Gabriel players
Primera División (women) players
Spain women's youth international footballers
Spanish expatriate women's footballers
Spanish expatriate sportspeople in the Netherlands
Expatriate women's footballers in the Netherlands